The Lithuania national under-19 football team represents Lithuania in international football at the under-19 age level and is governed by the Lithuanian Football Federation.

Recent results

Achievements 
Under-19 Baltic Cup winners
 2010, 2015, 2017
UEFA European Under-19 Championship group stage
 1998 (U-18 format), 2013 (hosts)

Current squad
 The following players were called up to the 2023 UEFA European Under-19 Championship qualifiers in September 2022.

Caps and goals correct as of: 27 September 2022, after the match against 

|-----
! colspan="9" bgcolor="#B0D3FB" align="left" |
|----- bgcolor="#DFEDFD"

|-----
! colspan="9" bgcolor="#B0D3FB" align="left" |
|----- bgcolor="#DFEDFD"

|-----
! colspan="9" bgcolor="#B0D3FB" align="left" |
|----- bgcolor="#DFEDFD"

See also

 Lithuania national football team
 Lithuania national under-21 football team

References

External links
 Uefa Under-19 website

European national under-19 association football teams
under-19